Transition metal silane complexes are coordination compounds containing hydrosilane ligands. An early example is (MeC5H4)Mn(CO)2(η2-HSiPh3) (Ph = C6H5). 

The bonding in silane sigma complexes is similar to that invoked in agostic interactions. The metal center engages the Si-H entity via a 3-center, 2-electron bond. It is widely assumed that these sigma complexes are intermediates in the oxidative addition of hydrosilanes to give metal silyl hydrides. This transformation is invoked in hydrosilylation catalysis.

Evidence for sigma-silane complexes is provided by proton NMR spectroscopy. For (MeC5H4)Mn(CO)2(η2-HSiPh3), J(29Si,1H) = 65 Hz compared to 180 Hz in free diphenylsilane. In silyl hydride complexes, the coupling in about 6 Hz. Neutron diffraction studies reveal a Si-H distance of 1.802(5) Å in the corresponding η2-HSiFPh2 complex vs 1.48 Å in free HSiFPh2. Elongated Si-H bonds are characteristic of these sigma complexes.

References